Amaurobius agastus is a species of spider in the family Amaurobiidae, found in the United States.

References

agastus
Spiders of the United States
Spiders described in 1947